Sithembile Makongolo (born 21 April 1985) is a South African cricketer. He played in eight first-class and four List A matches from 2004 to 2010.

References

External links
 

1985 births
Living people
South African cricketers
Border cricketers
Eastern Province cricketers